Krini may refer to:
Krini, Aigialeia, a village in the municipality of Aigialeia, Achaea, Greece
Krini, Corfu, a small village
Krini, Cyprus, Northern Cyprus, a village near Kyrenia
Krini, Greece, a small village in northern Greece
Krini, Patras, a village in the municipality of Patras, Achaea, Greece
Krini, Trikala, a town in Greece
Çeşme, a town in Turkey (traditional Greek name Krini)